Kalmo (Finnish: Zombieroolipeli Kalmo) is a zombie role-playing game written by Risto "Nordic" Hieta and published by Arctic ranger productions.

Description
Kalmo is a light-hearted role-playing game where the players control characters who are newly created zombies. Players try to integrate their zombies into normal society, hoping that no one will notice and destroy the zombie.

Hieto also developed Elokalmo, a live action role-playing game version of Kalmo.

References

Horror role-playing games
Finnish role-playing games